Scythropopsis lacrymans is a species of beetle in the family Cerambycidae.

References

Acanthoderini
Beetles described in 1865